Werner Bickelhaupt (born 2 December 1939) is a German professional football coach who has managed at both national and international level in Europe, Asia and Africa.

Career
Born in Ober-Ramstadt, Bickelhaupt has managed SpVgg Greuther Fürth, Freiburger FC, Spvgg Freudenstadt, Würzburger FV, SC Young Fellows Juventus, Thailand, FV Biberach and Al Ittihad.

In 1978 he became the first foreign coach of Bangladesh. He also managed the Bangladesh U19 team at the 1978 AFC Youth Championship, held in Dhaka, Bangladesh.

In October 2003 he became the new head coach of the Swaziland national football team. In December 2003 Bickelhaupt was sacked as manager after Swaziland lost to the Cape Verde Islands in the preliminaries of the 2006 World Cup qualifiers.

References

External links

1939 births
Living people
German football managers
SpVgg Greuther Fürth managers
Al Ittihad Alexandria Club managers
Sakaryaspor managers
Bangladesh national football team managers
Thailand national football team managers
Eswatini national football team managers
German expatriate football managers
West German expatriate sportspeople in Switzerland
Expatriate football managers in Switzerland
West German expatriate sportspeople in Bangladesh
Expatriate football managers in Bangladesh
West German expatriate sportspeople in Thailand
Expatriate football managers in Thailand
West German expatriate sportspeople in Egypt
Expatriate football managers in Egypt
West German expatriate sportspeople in Turkey
Expatriate football managers in Turkey
German expatriate sportspeople in Eswatini
Expatriate football managers in Eswatini
VfR Aalen managers
Freiburger FC managers
West German football managers
West German expatriate football managers